Sir Thomas Frankland, 3rd Baronet (c. 1685 – 17 April 1747), of Thirkleby in Yorkshire, was an English Whig politician who sat in the English and British House of Commons for over 30 years between 1708 and 1741.

Early life
Frankland was the eldest son of Sir Thomas Frankland, 2nd Baronet and Elizabeth Russell (through whom he was a descendant of Oliver Cromwell). He was admitted at Jesus College, Cambridge in 1700. Between 1704 and 1705 he travelled abroad in Italy and studied at Padua University in 1705. He was elected a Fellow of the Royal Society in March, 1707.

Political career
Frankland was elected Member of Parliament for Harwich at the 1708 general election and was returned unopposed in 1710. He was returned unopposed as MP for the family borough of Thirsk at the 1713 and 1715 general elections. In 1715 he was appointed to the post of Clerk of the Deliveries of the Ordnance which he held until 1722. He was returned unopposed for Thirsk at the 1722 general election and was appointed to the post of Commissioner of Revenue (Ireland) in 1724. He succeeded to the baronetcy on the death of his father on 30 October 1726. Returned again for Thirsk in 1727 he changed post to become a Member of the Board of Trade in 1728. In 1730 he became instead one of the Lords of the Admiralty. He was returned unopposed again at Thirsk at the 1734 and 1741 general elections.

Family and legacy
Frankland died on 17 April 1747. He had married twice. Firstly on 5 June 1715, he married Dinah Topham, daughter of Francis Topham of Agelthorpe, by whom he had two daughters:
 Elizabeth (died 1742), who married John Trevor of Trevallyn and Plasteg
 Dinah, Countess of Lichfield (1719–1779), who married The 3rd Earl of Lichfield
His second wife was Sarah Moseley (died 1783) whom he married on 9 July 1741 She was 40 years his junior and was left all his property in his will. The will was contested and rejected as being made "while he was under undue influence and while of unsound mind". An earlier will left her the property only for life.

As he had no son, the baronetcy passed to his nephew, Charles, son of his brother Henry Frankland, Governor of Bengal.

References

|-

1680s births
1747 deaths
Frankland, Thomas, 3rd Baronet
Members of the Parliament of Great Britain for English constituencies
British MPs 1708–1710
British MPs 1710–1713
British MPs 1713–1715
British MPs 1715–1722
British MPs 1722–1727
British MPs 1727–1734
British MPs 1734–1741
British MPs 1747–1754
Fellows of the Royal Society
Thomas
Lords of the Admiralty